The Jalaur River, also known as Jalaud River, is the second longest river on Panay island in the Philippines, with a total length of  and the second largest by drainage basin after Panay River in Capiz. Its source is in the Central Panay Mountain Range, west of Calinog, and the river traverses east to southeast before emptying into the Guimaras Strait. It drains the eastern portion of Panay and courses through Passi City and the towns of Leganes, Zarraga, Dumangas, Barotac Nuevo, Pototan, Dingle, San Enrique, Duenas, and Calinog, all in Iloilo province.

The river provides irrigation to farmlands as well as providing a source of potable water.

The river is the site of the Jalaur Mega Dam project that begun in 2019.

Etymology
Jalaur, also known by its variant form Jalaud, seems to be a Hispanicized form of Halawod, the river which serves as the core setting of Hinilawod, an epic poem from Panay.

Geography

The lower reached of the Jalaur River experiences seasonal flooding. When there is heavy downpour, during the months of June to September, the river overflows and floods the surrounding area. Panay island is also located within the typhoon belt, which experiences several typhoons annually, is also a major factor of flooding of the river.

Municipalities/Cities

The Jalaur River passes through the following city and municipalities:

Cities:
 Passi City

Municipalities:
 Leganes, Iloilo
 Zarraga, Iloilo
 Dumangas, Iloilo
 Barotac Nuevo, Iloilo
 Pototan, Iloilo
 Dingle, Iloilo
 San Enrique, Iloilo
 Dueñas, Iloilo
 Calinog, Iloilo

Economic importance
The Jalaur River is used in irrigating  in the province of Iloilo through the Jalaur River Irrigation System.

The Metro Iloilo Water District, the potable water provider for Iloilo City, sources some of its water requirement from the river.

References

Rivers of the Philippines
Landforms of Iloilo